Ixora elongata, the rosy ixora, is a small tree endemic to the Western Ghats of India. They are found as undergrowth in evergreen to dry evergreen and semi-evergreen forests between 300 and 900 m.

References

External links

 Places where seen and details

elongata
Flora of India (region)